Acanthocera longicornis is a species of horse flies in the family Tabanidae.

Distribution
Brazil.

References

Tabanidae
Insects described in 1775
Insects of Brazil
Diptera of South America
Taxa named by Johan Christian Fabricius